The Ransom Everglades School "Pagoda" is a historic school building in Coconut Grove in Miami, Florida. It is located at 3575 Main Highway. On July 25, 1973, it was added to the U.S. National Register of Historic Places as the Ransom School "Pagoda".

The Pagoda was built in 1902 as the principal structure for a school first known as Pine Knot Camp by the Buffalo, New York architects Green and Wicks. It has been described as looking "about as Chinese as a hamburger". Later the name of the school was changed to the Adirondack-Florida School and then Ransom School and finally, Ransom Everglades after merging with "The Everglades School for Girls" in 1974.

Classes are occasionally taught in the Pagoda, although it now consists of mostly offices.  Meetings and other events are also regularly held in the Pagoda.

References

External links
 Dade County listings at National Register of Historic Places
 Dade County listings at Florida's Office of Cultural and Historical Programs

Buildings and structures in Miami
Education in Miami
National Register of Historic Places in Miami
School buildings on the National Register of Historic Places in Florida
School buildings completed in 1902
1902 establishments in Florida
Green & Wicks buildings